The Boxing Writers Association of America (BWAA) was originally formed in 1926 as the Boxing Writers Association of Greater New York. The association's purpose is to promote better working conditions for boxing writers, as well as hold its writers to the highest professional and ethical standards.  The BWAA has a yearly awards banquet where it names fighter, fight, and trainer of the year, among other awards.

Awards

Decennial
Joe Louis Award (BWAA Fighter of the Decade)

Annual
Sugar Ray Robinson Award (BWAA Fighter of the Year)
Muhammad AliJoe Frazier Award (BWAA Fight of the Year)
Eddie Futch Award (BWAA Trainer of the Year)
Cus D'Amato Award (BWAA Manager of the Year)
Sam Taub Award (Excellence in boxing journalism)
Bill Crawford Award
Female Fighter of the Year Award

See also
National Sportscasters and Sportswriters Association

Footnotes

External links
Boxing Writers Association of America official website
List of award winners from the Boxing Writers Association of America

Boxing in the United States
American sports journalism organizations
Journalism-related professional associations
Sports organizations established in 1926